The L-13 Blaník is a two-seater trainer glider produced by Let Kunovice since 1956. It is the most numerous and widely used glider in the world. In United States Air Force Academy service, it is designated TG-10C and was used for basic flight training up to 2012.

Design

 Fuselage of semi-monocoque construction employing longerons and bulkheads, with an ovoid cross-section. The cockpit is covered with a two-part acrylic glass canopy.
 Trapezoidal single-taper wings with forward (negative) sweep, single-spar, all-metal construction. Metal ‘salmon’ tips. Flaps and ailerons have a metal frame and are covered in fabric. Metal DFS type spoilers on the upper and lower wing surfaces.
 The horizontal tail surfaces fold up parallel to the fin for transportation and storage.
 The elevator and rudder are metal frames covered in fabric.
 The main single-wheel landing gear is sprung with an oleo-pneumatic shock absorber.  When retracted, it still protrudes enough outside so there is little or no damage even if the wheel is accidentally left in the raised position for landing.

Development
The L-13 Blaník was designed by Karel Dlouhý of VZLÚ Letňany c. 1956, building upon the experience gained with the Letov XLF-207 Laminar, the first Czech glider to employ laminar flow wing profiles. The L-13 was developed as a practical glider suitable for basic flight instruction, aerobatic instruction and cross-country training. This design concept was combined with true and tested technology: metal construction, NACA laminar profiles and many standard-issue components of the Soviet aerospace industry.

The Blaník entered production in 1958 and quickly gained popularity as an inexpensive, rugged and durable type, which was easy to fly and operate. It was widely adopted in the Soviet bloc and was exported in large numbers to Western Europe and North America. Total production was in excess of 2650, or more than 3000 if variants are included. More than half a century after its first flight it is still the most common glider in the world.

The Blaník achieved many two-seater world distance records during the 1960s.  The Blaník inspired other designs, notably the Démant and L-21 Spartak single-seaters developed to equip the Czechoslovak team in the 1956 and 1958 World Championships.

Operational history
The effectiveness of the Blaník as a primary trainer is due to a blend of characteristics that facilitate progress of ab initio students towards solo flight, namely: slow landing speed, ample control deflections and an effective rudder. These are in effect typical of wood-and-fabric primary trainers such as the ASK 13, which the Blaník resembles in handling, though not in materials and construction.

The Blaník was originally stressed for simple aerobatics, including inverted flight where the aircraft has a single occupant. As a result of this latter requirement, intermediate level aerobatic training in the Blaník was done in solo flight with the instructor on the ground or in another aircraft. A manufacturer airworthiness directive in June 2010 asserted a prohibition against all aerobatic manoeuvres.

2010 main-spar failure
A Blaník L-13 (not an L-13AC, which has a different wing and type certificate) was involved in a fatal accident in Austria on 12 June 2010, when a wing spar failed at height, leading to separation of the wing and loss of control of the aircraft. A newspaper reported the cause of the failure as excessive stress during a manoeuvre. However, the preliminary investigation revealed that the fracture may have been due to metal fatigue, and not necessarily from being overstressed. As a precaution, the manufacturer issued an emergency bulletin on 18 June 2010 directing that each aircraft be grounded pending a full inspection of wing spars, and compilation of usage patterns from logbook records. Following inspection, the aircraft would be permitted to fly on a non-aerobatic basis only.

Variants
L-13 AC Blaník The L-13 AC is primarily intended for aerobatic training with a wider flight envelope enabling dual training up to intermediate-level. It combines the wings and cockpit of the L-23 Super Blaník with the single-piece canopy and conventional empennage of the L-13.  This model is considered stronger and different enough from a conventional L-13, L-13/AC uses a shorter L-23 wing and is not affected by 2010 spar issues of the L-13.

L-13 JAn auxiliary-powered Blaník was also developed, with an external Jawa engine permanently mounted on a pylon above the rear fuselage.

Sportinė Aviacija SL-2Paka Kensgaila VK-7 A twin-fuselage Blaník was developed by Sportinė Aviacija in Lithuania as a flying laboratory for testing of laminar airfoils. The specimen profiles are fixed to a supporting frame erected between the fuselages. This variant is similar in concept to the modified Janus once operated by the DFVLR (today the DLR, or German Aerospace Center) for the same purpose.

L-13 TJ(OK-3801) single-seat experimental motor glider fitted with a jet engine TJ-100C with take-off thrust 1,0 kN from První brněnská strojírna Velká Bíteš.

L-13 B Bačostroj(OK-8902) single-seat experimental motor glider with Walter Mikron IIIA, 48 kW

L-13 A1(Llewellyn Modification) to extend the fatigue life to nominally three times the basic Blanik L-13 life.

TG-10 Blanik
United States Air Force Academy, gliding school.

Aerotechnik L-13 Vivattouring motorglider derivative. The wings, fuselage and tail surfaces of the L-13 are mated to a cockpit featuring side-by-side seats and a conventional firewall-forward engine installation with either a Walter Mikron IIIAE four-cylinder inverted inline engine or a Limbach L2000.

Aerotechnik L-13 SE Vivat

Aerotechnik L-13 SW Vivat

Aerotechnik L 13 SEH Vivat

Aerotechnik L-13 SDM Vivat

Aerotechnik L 13 SL Vivat

Aerotechnik L-13 SDL Vivat

Operators
The Blanik has been owned and operated by individuals and gliding schools around the world. Some individuals club together to form syndicates to operate the aircraft. A small number have been operated by the military.

Military operators 
 Australia
 Australian Defence Force - Australian Defence Force Cadets 10 operated between 1961 to 2020

Estonian Air Force two operated between 1998 and 2005

Italian Air Force  operated 2 LET L-13 Blaník from 1977 until 1999

Lithuanian National Defence Volunteer Forces - 14 Blanik's operated in National Defence Volunteer Forces (SKAT) since 1993 up to 1998

Soviet Air Force

Spanish Air Force

United States Air Force Academy from 2002 until 2012.

Uruguayan Air Force

Aircraft on display
 An L-13 is on display at the Museo del Aire in Madrid.
 An L-13 is on display at the Aviation History and Technology Center in Marietta, Georgia.
 An L-13 is on display at Atomic Motors Classic Cars and Motorcycles in Henderson, NV

Specifications (L-13 Blaník)

See also

Notes

References

External links

LET website
Website of Blanik America
Photo of the SL-2P flying laboratory
Sailplane directory

1960s Czechoslovakian sailplanes
Glider aircraft
L-13
Forward-swept-wing aircraft
Aircraft first flown in 1956